Mitogen-activated protein kinase kinase kinase 15 is a protein that in humans is encoded by the MAP3K15 gene.

Function

The protein encoded by this gene is a member of the mitogen-activated protein kinase (MAPK) family. These family members function in a protein kinase signal transduction cascade, where an activated MAPK kinase kinase (MAP3K) phosphorylates and activates a specific MAPK kinase (MAP2K), which then activates a specific MAPK. This MAP3K protein plays an essential role in apoptotic cell death triggered by cellular stresses.

References

Further reading 

Human proteins
Genetics
Genes